Borale Ale is a stratovolcano located in the Great Rift Valley, Ethiopia.

See also
List of stratovolcanoes

References 

Mountains of Ethiopia
Stratovolcanoes of Ethiopia
Afar Region